More to Hate is the third studio album by American rapper Big B. It was released on August 28, 2007 via Suburban Noize Records. The album features guest appearances from Kottonmouth Kings, Blaze Ya Dead Homie, Danny Diablo, Sen Dog and Tech N9NE. Its lead single, "White Trash Life", debuted on Sirius Radio on July 13, 2007.

Track listing

Chart history

References

2007 albums
Big B (rapper) albums
Suburban Noize Records albums